This List of Hewlett-Packard executive leadership includes chairmen, presidents and CEOs of Hewlett-Packard.

Co-founder: David Packard (President: 1947; Chairman: 1964–1969; Chairman 1971–1993)
Co-founder: William Hewlett (Vice President: 1947; Executive Vice President: 1957; President: 1964; CEO: 1969; Chairman of the Executive Committee 1978; Vice Chairman 1983–1987)
CEO: John A. Young (1978–October 31, 1992)
CEO: Lewis Platt (November 1, 1992–July 18, 1999; Chairman 1993–July 18, 1999)
Chairman: Richard Hackborn (January, 2000–September 22, 2000; Lead Independent Director September 22, 2006–)
CEO: Carly Fiorina (July 19, 1999–February 9, 2005; Chairwoman September 22, 2000–February 9, 2005)
President: Michael Capellas (May 3, 2002 to November 12, 2002)
Interim CEO: Robert Wayman (February 9, 2005–March 28, 2005)
Chairwoman: Patricia C. Dunn (February 9, 2005–September 22, 2006).
President and CEO: Mark Hurd (CEO: April 1, 2005–August 6, 2010; Chairman: September 22, 2006–August 6, 2010)
Interim CEO: Cathie Lesjak (August 6, 2010–September 30, 2010)
President and CEO: Léo Apotheker (September 30, 2010–September 22, 2011)
Executive Chairman: Raymond J. Lane (September 22, 2011–April 4, 2013)
Nonexecutive Chairman: Ralph V. Whitworth (April 4, 2013–July 16, 2014))
Chairwoman, President and CEO: Meg Whitman (President and CEO: September 22, 2011–November 2, 2015; Chairman: July 18, 2014–January 31, 2018)

HP Inc.
CEO: Dion Weisler (November 2, 2015 – November 1, 2019)
Current: CEO: Enrique Lores (November 2, 2019–)

Hewlett Packard Enterprise
CEO: Meg Whitman (November 2, 2015 -February 1, 2018)
Current: CEO: Antonio Neri (February 1, 2018)

References

http://www8.hp.com/sg/en/hp-information/executive-team/team.html

Hewlett-Packard people
HP